This is a list of films produced and filmed in Latin America, ordered by country of origin.

North America

Mexico

South America

Argentina

Bolivia

Brazil

Chile

 Coronación (2000)
 Estadio Nacional (2002)
 Machuca (2004)
 Mi Mejor Enemigo (2005)
 Sexo con Amor (2003)
 Taxi Para Tres (2001)

Colombia

Ecuador

 Crónicas (2004)
Qué Tan Lejos (2006)
 Ratas Ratones y Rateros (1999)

Paraguay

Peru

Uruguay

A dios momo (2006) 
A las cinco en punto (2004) 
A pesar de todo (2003) 
Acratas (2000) 
Alguien debe morir (2002) 
Alguien lo tiene que hacer (2004) 
Alma mater (2004) 
Almohadón de plumas (1988) 
Ana Was Here (2005) 
Andrajo (1998) 
Aparte (2002) 
Arrinconados (1992) 
El Arte de resistir (2004) 
Australia (2004/II) 
Azul (2004)
Souls on the Coast (1923)

Venezuela

Central America

Costa Rica

Alsino y el cóndor (1982)    
Asesinato en el Meneo (2001)
Caribe (2004)   
El Fin (2011)
Gestación (2009)
La Insurrección (1980) 
Password: Una mirada en la oscuridad (2002)    
El Regreso (2011)
El Sanatorio (2010)

El Salvador
 The Black Pirates (El Pirata Negro) (1954)
 Solo de noche vienes (1966)
 Voces Innocentes (2005)

Guatemala

Ambiguity: Crónica de un Sueño Americano (2015)
Donde Acaban los Caminos (2004)
Capsulas (2011)
 El Norte (1983), filmed in California and Mexico, about Guatemalans
Puro Mula (2011)
El Regreso de Lencho (2011)

Honduras
4 Catrachos en Apuros (2016)
11 Cipotes (2014)
Amor y Frijoles (2009)
Anita, La Cazadora de Insectos (2001)   
Lara (2003)   
Libre Mente en Cerrado (2002)   
No Hay Tierra Sin Dueño (2003)
¿Quién Paga la Cuenta? (2013)
Second Coming (2008)
Spirit of My Mother (1999)
The Zwickys (2015)

Nicaragua

Alsino y el cóndor (1982)   
The Art of Travel (2007)
El Center fielder (1985)   
El Espectro de la Guerra (1988)   
Estos sí pasarán (1985)   
El Inmortal (2005)   
Llamada de la muerte (1960)   
Metal y vidrio (2002)   
Sandino (1990)   
Sexto sentido  (2001), TV series
The World Stopped Watching (2003)

Panama
 Chance (2010), featuring Francisco Gattorno, Isabella Santo Domingo, and Aida Morales, and with the presentation of Rosa Lorenzo

Caribbean

Cuba

Dominican Republic

Haiti

Puerto Rico

External links
 Latin American films at the Internet Movie Database
 Top 100 Ibero-American movies of all time

Further reading 
 Isabel Maurer Queipo (ed.): "Directory of World Cinema: Latin America", intellectbooks, Bristol 2013, 

Latin America

Films
Films
Films